Old Scratch or Mr. Scratch is a nickname or pseudonym for the Devil. The name likely comes from Middle English scrat, the name of a demon or goblin, derived from Old Norse skratte.

Mentions
Examples of usage of the name "Old Scratch" are found in:

Literature
"The Devil and Tom Walker" (1824) by Washington Irving
A Christmas Carol (1843) by Charles Dickens
The Three Clerks (1857) by Anthony Trollope
The Adventures of Tom Sawyer (1876) by Mark Twain
The Sing-Song of Old Man Kangaroo (1900) by Rudyard Kipling
"The Devil and Daniel Webster" (1936) by Stephen Vincent Benét
"Prologue to an Adventure" (1938) by Dylan Thomas
"The Fair to Middling (1959) by Arthur Calder-Marshall
"The Last Rung on the Ladder" (1978) by Stephen King
Miracle Monday (1981) by Elliot S. Maggin
Jonathan Strange & Mr Norrell (2004) by Susanna Clarke
The Barn at the End of Our Term (2007) by Karen Russell
Homestuck (2009) by Andrew Hussie
I, Ripper (2015) by Stephen Hunter
Chilling Adventures of Sabrina #6 (2016) by Roberto Aguirre-Sacasa
 Scratchman (2019) by Tom Baker
Windswept House (1996, pg 402) by Fr. Malachi Martin

Film
The Devil and Daniel Webster (1941)
The Story of Mankind (1957)
Crossroads (1986)
Prince of Darkness (1987)
The Witches of Eastwick (1987)
Rock 'n' Roll Nightmare (1987)
Crazy as Hell (2002)
Mud (2012)

TelevisionConstantineAmerican Dad! (Episode: "Permanent Record Wrecker")Lucifer (Episode: "Lucifer, Stay. Good Devil.")Quantum Leap (Episode: "The Boogieman")The Messengers (Episode: "Death Becomes Her")Billions (Episode: "The Wrong Maria Gonzalez")
American Horror Story (Episode: "Sojourn")
Criminal Minds
Chilling Adventures of Sabrina Netflix TV Series (2018) by Roberto Aguirre-Sacasa
 Being Human
Hap and Leonard (TV series) (Season 3, Episode 1)
The Cuphead Show (season 1, episode 1, Carn-Evil)
A Christmas Carol (FX, 2019)

Music
"Beelz" song written by Stephen Lynch
"Three Men Hanging" song by Murder by Death
"Tight Like That" by Clutch
"Un-Reborn Again" by Queens of the Stone Age
"Bewitched" by Beat Happening
”The Devil Lives in a Mason Jar” by John Driskell Hopkins

Video games
Alan Wake
Alan Wake's American Nightmare
 Descent 3
 Assassin's Creed IV: Black Flag
 Pirate101
The Simpsons: Tapped Out

Miscellaneous

Episode 12 of the podcast Welcome to Night Vale

References

American legendary creatures
The Devil in legend
Devils